Michel Bourgeau (born June 28, 1960) is a former Canadian football defensive lineman who played ten seasons in the Canadian Football League for the Ottawa Rough Riders and the Edmonton Eskimos.

Born in Montreal, Quebec, Bourgeau played college football in the western United States at Boise State University   In his freshman year, the Broncos won the Big Sky title and the Division I-AA national championship.  He was selected in the eleventh round of the 1984 NFL Draft by the New Orleans Saints.

Bourgeau was also selected in the CFL Draft, fifth in the territorial exemption portion,  and played with the Rough Riders for five seasons. He spent his last five seasons in Edmonton and retired after the 1993 season, after winning

References

External links
Stats Crew – Michel Bourgeau (CFL)

1961 births
Living people
Boise State Broncos football players
Canadian football defensive linemen
Edmonton Elks players
French Quebecers
Ottawa Rough Riders players
Players of Canadian football from Quebec
Canadian football people from Montreal